Viva Technology, or VivaTech, is an annual technology conference, dedicated to innovation and startups, held in Paris, France. VivaTech was founded in 2016 by Publicis Groupe and Groupe Les Echos. The first two days of VivaTech are for startups, investors, executives, students and academics, and it is open to the general public on the third day.

2016 
The first year of VivaTech was held from 30 June to 2 July 2016 in Paris, and gathered 45,000 visitors including 5,000 startup companies.

2017 
In 2017, VivaTech was held at Paris expo Porte de Versailles from 14 to 16 June in Paris. In attendance were 6,000 startup firms, 1,400 investors, and 1,500 journalists. French President Emmanuel Macron delivered the keynote address and announced the creation of a 10-billion Euro fund for innovation and the launch of a French technology visa for international entrepreneurs.

One thousand startups were exhibited in 20 open innovation "labs" sponsored by corporate groups (AccorHotels, Air France, KLM, Airbus, BNPP, La Poste, Cisco, Engie, Carrefour, LVMH, RATP Group, SNCF, Sodexo, Sanofi, Orange, TF1, Talan, Pari mutuel urbain, Vinci Energies, Valeo).

Speakers including Eric Schmidt, Daniel Zhang and John Collison were also in attendance.

2018 
In 2018, VivaTech took place from 24 to 26 May in Paris. Over 100,000 visitors and over 300 speakers attended the third edition of the event including Mark Zuckerberg, Satya Nadella, Dara Khosrowshahi, Ginni Rometty, Chuck Robbins and Bill McDermott.

French President Emmanuel Macron returned to VivaTech in 2018 and announced that the French government will launch a R900 million-programme aimed at investing in African startups.

A partnership was established with TechCrunch and the Startup Battlefield, a competition for startups where the winners attended the Startup Battlefield finals in San Francisco in September 2018.

2019 
In 2019, the fourth edition of the event was marked by a trend towards positive innovation ("tech for good") as well as the presence of 124,000 visitors at Paris Expo Porte de Versailles, on 16 and 17 May for professionals, and on 18 May for the general public.

Nearly 13,000 startups were present, as well as 450 prominent figures from all over the world, such as Jack Ma of Alibaba Group, Justin Trudeau, Olympic medallist Usain Bolt, Holly Ridings of NASA, Ken Hu of Huawei, Young Sohn of Samsung, John Kerry and Margrethe Vestager.

2021 
In 2021, the fifth edition of the event was held marked by a trend towards Positive change through technology at Paris Expo Porte de Versailles and online, on 16, 17 and 18 June.

Prominent figures from all over the world were present, such as Tim Cook of Apple, Peggy Johnson of Magic Leap, Eric Yuan of Zoom, Mark Zuckerberg of Facebook, Melissa Bell of CNN, Emmanuel Macron and Fionn Ferreira

References

External links 
 Official website

Exhibitions in France
Technology conferences
Business conferences